Bertha Amy Lewis (12 May 1887 – 8 May 1931) was an English opera singer and actress primarily known for her work as principal contralto in the Gilbert and Sullivan comic operas with the D'Oyly Carte Opera Company.

Life and career

Early life and career
Lewis was born in Forest Gate, London. She attended St. Angela's High School, Upton and then studied voice at the Royal Academy of Music, gaining an A.R.A.M. qualification.  She had made professional appearances on the concert stage but had not acted before she joined D'Oyly Carte at the age of 19 in 1906 as Kate in The Pirates of Penzance. She soon was touring with the company as Kate, Lady Saphir in Patience, Leila in Iolanthe, Ada in Princess Ida, Vittoria in The Gondoliers, and First Bridesmaid in Trial by Jury. In 1908, at the Savoy Theatre, she played the part of Gwenny Davis in Fenn and Faraday's A Welsh Sunset, a curtain raiser to H.M.S. Pinafore. She soon added to her repertoire Leila in Iolanthe and Inez in The Gondoliers.

In 1909 she replaced Ethel Morrison as principal contralto, playing Little Buttercup in H.M.S. Pinafore, Ruth in Pirates, Lady Jane in Patience, the Queen of the Fairies in Iolanthe, Lady Blanche in Princess Ida, Katisha in The Mikado, Dame Carruthers in The Yeomen of the Guard, and the Duchess of Plaza-Toro in The Gondoliers. In 1910 she married the baritone Herbert Heyner; in the same year she left the company to tour the UK in concerts and grand opera, appearing in the title role of Bizet's Carmen, as Delilah in Camille Saint-Saëns's  Samson and Delilah, and as Amneris in Verdi's Aida.

Principal contralto and untimely death

She returned to the company in 1914, replacing Louie René as principal contralto. Derek Oldham later reported that, in 1920, at the insistence of musical director Geoffrey Toye, Rupert D'Oyly Carte considered expanding the company's repertoire so she could play Carmen. For more than 16 years after her return, Lewis portrayed all the leading contralto roles in the company's repertory: Lady Sangazure in The Sorcerer, Buttercup, Ruth, Lady Jane, Fairy Queen, Lady Blanche, Katisha, Dame Hannah in Ruddigore, Dame Carruthers, and the Duchess of Plaza-Toro.

Lewis died at the age of 43 in May 1931 after sustaining fatal injuries in a car accident. She was travelling from Manchester to Cambridge in a car driven by Henry Lytton in a rainstorm. Lytton was injured in the accident but recovered and returned to performing after a few months. Lewis was in the hospital for five days before succumbing to her injuries. Queen Mary made personal enquiries, and the newspapers and the BBC gave daily news reports about her condition. She was buried in Cambridge City Cemetery and, whilst it was a double grave, she lies there alone. Her husband, Herbert Heyner, did not attend her funeral. In June 1931 he married Mary Louise Hamilton.

Lewis is often cited as the greatest contralto in the history of the  D'Oyly Carte Opera Company.  Her powerful voice (preserved on recordings), crisp diction and formidable stage personality were well known.  Of her performance in the production of The Mikado in 1926, The Times wrote that she "was majestic as Katisha. ... getting a serious dramatic significance into her part and illustrating the fact that the humour of Gilbert and Sullivan comes out best by serious treatment."

Recordings
With the D'Oyly Carte Opera Company, Lewis recorded Buttercup (part in 1922, all in 1930), Ruth (1931), Lady Jane (1930), Queen of the Fairies (1929), Lady Blanche (1924), Katisha (1926), Dame Hannah (1924) and The Duchess of Plaza-Toro (1927).  She participated in the 1926 BBC radio broadcast of The Mikado, and appeared as Katisha in a four-minute silent promotional film made to promote the Charles Ricketts-redressed Mikado also in 1926.

References 

Sources

External links
Profile of Lewis
Another profile of Lewis
Photos of Lewis
More photos of Lewis

1887 births
1931 deaths
English actresses
English opera singers
English contraltos
Operatic contraltos
Road incident deaths in England
20th-century English singers
20th-century English women singers
Burials at the Cambridge City Cemetery